Granin is a family of proteins. Granin may also refer to
 Daniil Granin (1919–2017), Soviet novelist
 Aleksandr Leonovitch Granin, a character in Metal Gear Solid 3: Snake Eater